Michele Novaro (23 December 1818 – 20 October 1885) was an Italian composer.

Novaro was born on 23 December 1818 in Genoa, where he studied composition and singing. Novaro is mostly known as the composer of the music of the Italian national anthem, Il Canto degli Italiani (lyrics by Goffredo Mameli), better known in Italy as Inno di Mameli (Mameli's Hymn).

Novaro was a convinced liberal and offered his compositional talents to the unification cause without deriving any personal benefits. He died poor on 20 October 1885, after a life riddled with financial and health difficulties. He was buried at the Monumental Cemetery of Staglieno in Genoa.

References

External links

1818 births
1885 deaths
19th-century Italian composers
Italian male composers
Musicians from Genoa
National anthem writers
19th-century Italian musicians
19th-century Italian male musicians